Hunthouse Wood is a nature reserve of the Worcestershire Wildlife Trust, situated near the villages of Clows Top and Mamble, in Worcestershire, England.

Description
The reserve, area , has been managed by the Trust since 1976; it is made up of Hunthouse, Winricks and Brockhill Woods, and it is part of the Dumbleton Dingle Site of Special Scientific Interest.

The steep-sided valley of a stream, running north–south, is within the wood; ferns and mosses are abundant near the stream. There are many tree species including oak, ash, rowan and lime. Wildlife habitats vary from open areas to undisturbed woods.

There are traces of the former tramways built by Hunthouse Colliery for transporting coal, and the sites of old engines of the colliery are visible, particularly in winter when trees are bare.

References

Nature reserves in Worcestershire
Forests and woodlands of Worcestershire
Sites of Special Scientific Interest in Worcestershire